The FIS Alpine World Ski Championships 1950 were the 11th FIS Alpine World Ski Championships, held February 13–18 in the United States at Aspen, Colorado.

These were the first world championships held outside of Europe, and the first official world championships not concurrent with the Olympics since 1939.  The Giant slalom made its world championships debut and displaced the combined event, which returned to the program in 1954 as a "paper race," using the results of the three races (downhill, giant slalom, and slalom) through 1980.

At Aspen's Ajax Mountain, Zeno Colò of Italy won the downhill and giant slalom, and just missed a sweep of the gold medals; he finished 0.3 seconds behind in the slalom, taking the silver.  Austria dominated the women's races: Dagmar Rom won the giant slalom and slalom, Trude Jochum-Beiser won gold in the downhill and silver in the GS, and Erika Mahringer took two silver medals, in the downhill and slalom.

Aspen was in its fourth year as a ski area; it opened in December 1946 with a single chairlift.

The Nordic world championships were also held in the U.S. in 1950, at Lake Placid, New York. Due to a lack of snow at Lake Placid, the cross-country events were moved to Rumford, Maine.

Men's competitions

Downhill 
Saturday, February 18, 1950

Giant Slalom 

Tuesday, February 14, 1950

Slalom 
Thursday, February 16, 1950

Women's competitions

Downhill 
Friday, February 17, 1950

Trude Jochum-Beiser, 22, won the final women's event, averaging nearly .She had given birth to her first child just four months earlier.

Giant Slalom 
Monday, February 13, 1950

Slalom 
Wednesday, February 15, 1950

Medal Standings

Video
Vimeo.com – 1950 World Championships
Vimeo.com – (1950) Aspen FIS race coverage

References

External links
FIS-ski.com - results - 1950 World Championships - Aspen, CO, USA
Aspen Historical Society  - 1950 World Championships

1950 in alpine skiing
1950 in American sports
1950
Sports competitions in Colorado
International sports competitions hosted by the United States
Alpine skiing competitions in the United States
February 1950 sports events in the United States
1950 in sports in Colorado
Skiing in Colorado